Yarbo may refer to:

 Hank Yarbo, a fictional character in the Canadian television sitcom Corner Gas
 Yarbo, Alabama, United States
 Yarbo, Saskatchewan, Canada